The Muzza Canal in  Lombardy, Italy is one of the oldest European irrigation canals, excavated between 1220 and 1230 on Imperial decree by Lodi townspeople. It begins in Cassano d'Adda, and delivers Adda River water to a wide agricultural area.

References
.

Canals in Lombardy
Metropolitan City of Milan
Province of Lodi
Transport in Lombardy
Canals opened in 1230